Doña Pakyta Museum of Art is an art museum located in Almería. It was the home of Francisca Díaz Torres, known as Doña Pakyta, who granted it.

It was built in 1928 by Guillermo Langle, ordered by Antonio González Egea. It was opened in spring 2015.

References

External links

 

Museums in Andalusia
Museums established in 2005
1928 establishments in Spain
Art museums and galleries in Spain
Buildings and structures in Almería